Fifield is a town in Price County, Wisconsin, United States. The population was 879 at the 2018 census. The unincorporated community of Fifield is located in the community as well as the ghost town of Coolidge.

History
Fifield was founded in 1876, where the Wisconsin Central Railroad crossed the south fork of the Flambeau River in the big northern forest. The town is named after Sam Fifield, a politician and businessperson who served as Wisconsin's 14th Lieutenant Governor. As logging boomed and the population grew, a town hall was built in 1882, but burned in the fire of 1893, along with Fifield's whole business district of 60 buildings. The following spring, the town rebuilt the current hall with the same dimensions, headed by carpenter Theodore Ristin.

Geography
According to the United States Census Bureau, the town has a total area of 156.5 square miles (405.3 km2), of which, 149.4 square miles (386.9 km2) of it is land and 7.1 square miles (18.4 km2) of it (4.53%) is water.

Demographics

As of the census of 2000, there were 989 people, 436 households, and 283 families residing in the town. The population density was 6.6 people per square mile (2.6/km2). There were 760 housing units at an average density of 5.1 per square mile (2.0/km2). The racial makeup of the town was 98.08% White, 0.10% African American, 1.21% Native American, 0.10% Asian, 0.30% from other races, and 0.20% from two or more races. Hispanic or Latino of any race were 0.51% of the population.

There were 436 households, out of which 21.6% had children under the age of 18 living with them, 57.6% were married couples living together, 3.2% had a female householder with no husband present, and 34.9% were non-families. 30.3% of all households were made up of individuals, and 12.4% had someone living alone who was 65 years of age or older. The average household size was 2.27 and the average family size was 2.83.

In the town, the population was spread out, with 20.9% under the age of 18, 4.8% from 18 to 24, 25.1% from 25 to 44, 31.7% from 45 to 64, and 17.5% who were 65 years of age or older. The median age was 44 years. For every 100 females, there were 104.3 males. For every 100 females age 18 and over, there were 104.2 males.

The median income for a household in the town was $35,833, and the median income for a family was $44,917. Males had a median income of $32,212 versus $23,646 for females. The per capita income for the town was $19,083. About 5.3% of families and 6.9% of the population were below the poverty line, including 8.1% of those under age 18 and 7.8% of those age 65 or over.

Historic locations
Fifield Fire Lookout Tower
Fifield Town Hall
Round Lake Logging Dam

Notable people

 Robert W. Aschenbrener (1920–2009), World War II flying ace
 Barbara Anne Davis (1930–2008), All-American Girls Professional Baseball League player

References

External links
 Sanborn fire insurance maps: 1894 1901 1909

Towns in Price County, Wisconsin
Towns in Wisconsin